The Las Vegas City Marshals (LVCM) is a law enforcement agency in Las Vegas, Clark County, Nevada. The LVCM is essentially the city's park police, providing public safety and law enforcement to parks, trails, events, and city property. It is part of the City of Las Vegas Department of Public Safety (LVDPS).

The LVCM consisted of 53 Deputy City Marshals in 2017.

Overview
Deputy City Marshals are state-certified law enforcement officers that work for the city of Las Vegas and protect city property, parks, trails, and facilities. This is done in conjunction with the other law enforcement agencies in Las Vegas and Clark County, namely the Las Vegas Metropolitan Police Department, for whom the LVCM patrols parks.

The LVDPS also operates corrections officers, court marshals, and the city's animal control service, though these are not connected to the LVCM and its duties.

Rank structure

Equipment

Deputy City Marshals wear dark blue uniforms, though their police motorcycle units wear bright blue uniform tops. Deputy City Marshals are armed with a pistol alongside other standard police equipment, such as a taser and a baton.

The LVCM formerly used the Ford Crown Victoria Police Interceptor, but after its discontinuation, they were retired in favor of newer Ford Police Interceptor Sedan and Ford Police Interceptor Utility cruisers. The LVCM also uses a fleet of dirtbikes.

See also
List of law enforcement agencies in Nevada

References

Government of Las Vegas
Municipal police departments of Nevada
Park police departments of the United States